Douglas George Smith (19 March 1922 – 1 September 2009) was an Australian rules footballer who played with Collingwood in the Victorian Football League (VFL).

Notes

External links 

Profile at CollingwoodFC.com.au

2009 deaths
1922 births
Australian rules footballers from Tasmania
Collingwood Football Club players
Scottsdale Football Club players